Amber Verspaget (born 26 January 1998) is a Dutch footballer who plays as defender for Feyenoord in the Eredivisie.

Personal life
Verspaget was born in Eindhoven.

References

Living people
Dutch women's footballers
Eredivisie (women) players
1998 births
Women's association footballers not categorized by position
ADO Den Haag (women) players
Feyenoord (women) players